Mycterosuchus is an extinct genus of teleosaurid crocodyliform from the Middle Jurassic (Callovian) of England. Although previously synonymized with Steneosaurus, recent cladistic analysis considers it distantly related to the Steneosaurus type species.

Taxonomy
 
The name Mycterosuchus was coined for Steneosaurus nasutus by Andrews in 1913 in his catalogue of thalattosuchians from the Oxford Clay of southern England. Mycterosuchus nasutus was synonymized with Steneosaurus leedsi by Adams-Tresmand in 1987, but is recovered as a distinct species in the cladistic analysis of Osi et al. of 2018.

See also

List of marine reptiles

References

Prehistoric pseudosuchian genera
Prehistoric marine crocodylomorphs
Fossil taxa described in 1913
Middle Jurassic reptiles of Europe
Middle Jurassic crocodylomorphs
Thalattosuchians